Brunnion is a hamlet between Trencrom and Nancledra in west Cornwall, England, UK. It is in the civil parish of Ludgvan

References

Hamlets in Cornwall